Restless Youth is a 1928 silent American melodrama film, directed by Christy Cabanne. It stars Marceline Day, Ralph Forbes, and Norman Trevor, and was released on November 30, 1928.

The film's plot came from a story by Cosmo Hamilton.

Cast list
 Marceline Day as Dixie Calhoun
 Ralph Forbes as Bruce Neil
 Norman Trevor as John Neil
 Robert Ellis as Robert Haines
 Mary Mabery as Susan
 Wild Bill Elliott as George Baxter
 Roy Watson

Critical reception
A review in Harrison's Reports commented that after a "not so pleasing" start, the film became powerful. Day's performance was described as "excellent work", and the reviewer called Forbes "good as the hero".

References

External links 
 
 
 

.

Films directed by Christy Cabanne
Columbia Pictures films
American silent feature films
American black-and-white films
Silent American drama films
1928 drama films
1928 films
1920s English-language films
1920s American films